South Metropolitan TAFE (formerly known as Challenger Institute of Technology or Challenger TAFE) is a Technical and Further Education (TAFE) institution with campuses in Armadale, Bentley, Carlisle, Fremantle, Jandakot, Kwinana, Mandurah, Munster, Murdoch, Naval Base, Rockingham and Thornlie in Western Australia.

On 11 April 2016, Challenger Institute of Technology was merged with Polytechnic West, and became South Metropolitan TAFE. It is a registered training organisation (RTO Code: 52787) delivering more than 350 nationally accredited courses over a wide variety of industry training areas for full-time, part-time, workplace based and online study as well as customised training, apprenticeships and traineeships. South Metropolitan TAFE sees over 25,000 students each year across urban and regional communities. The TAFE is also attended by many international students at offshore training facilities and programs in Mauritius, Qatar, United Arab Emirates, India, China, Singapore, Sri Lanka and Indonesia.

South Metropolitan TAFE won the Australian Defence Industry Awards 2022 'Academic Institution of the Year' award in 2022, and the WA Training Awards 'Large Training Provider of the Year 2022'.

Courses
South Metropolitan TAFE award courses adhere to the Australian Quality Training Framework (AQTF), which establishes standard titles and levels for courses across Australia. Qualifications offered at South Metropolitan TAFE range from Certificate 1 level through to Advanced Diploma, as well as short courses, skill sets and customised training for business. The TAFE also has university pathway arrangements through Curtin University and Murdoch University. 

South Metropolitan TAFE's training covers a range of industry training areas, including: 
 Aerospace, Maritime and Logistics
 Agriculture, Animals, Science and the Environment
 Automotive
 Building and Construction
 Business and Finance
 Creative Industries
 Defence
 Education and Community Services
 Engineering and Mining
 English Language and Foundational Services
 Health, Beauty and Fitness 
 Hospitality, Tourism & Events
 Information Technology, Library and Digital

Campuses and Access Centres
South Metropolitan TAFE has campuses in Armadale, Bentley, Carlisle, Fremantle, Murdoch, Jandakot, Kwinana, Naval Base, Munster, Thornlie, Rockingham and Mandurah.

As well as its south metropolitan campuses, additional Access Centres are located in the regional towns of Pinjarra, Boddington, Waroona and Mundijong.

History
South Metropolitan TAFE can lay claim to being the oldest technical educational institution in Western Australia, tracing its roots to the late 19th century.

References

TAFE WA
Educational institutions established in 1898
1898 establishments in Australia